The yellow-rumped mannikin (Lonchura flaviprymna) also known as the yellow-rumped munia, is a species of estrildid finch found in the eastern Kimberley region and north-west Northern Territory, Australia. It has an estimated global extent of occurrence of 20,000 to 50,000 km2. It is found in subtropical to tropical mangrove, moist savanna and wetland habitats. The conservation status of the species is evaluated as being of Least Concern.

References

BirdLife Species Factsheet
Yellow-rumped mannikin: Nutrition, Breeding, Health Issues

yellow-rumped mannikin
Birds of the Northern Territory
Endemic birds of Australia
yellow-rumped mannikin